Off Centre is an American sitcom that aired on The WB network from October 14, 2001, to October 31, 2002. Created by Chris Weitz, Paul Weitz, and Danny Zuker, the series was heavily promoted as "from the guys who brought you American Pie".

Synopsis
The series is centered on the lives of two twentysomething friends, British stud Euan Pierce and play-it-safe American Mike Platt, after they move into the posh Hadley Building on New York's Centre Street. Rounding out the cast are Mike's girlfriend, Liz Lombardi, their wacky friend, Vietnamese restaurant owner Chau Presley, and secretly sensitive gangsta rapper Status Quo.

Characters

Main 
 Euan Pierce (played by Sean Maguire) – A womanizing graduate of Oxford University, suave Brit Euan works as an investment banker and is reckless with money, as seen in the lavish apartment he shares with Mike, which includes of all things, a $2,000 airplane propeller. Among the skeletons in his closet are his "fruity" middle name (Crispin) and the fact that he used to riverdance. He is loosely based on Chris Weitz's university friend and subsequent roommate Euan Rellie.
 Mike Platt (played by Eddie Kaye Thomas) – Unlike his Oxford roommate Euan, Mike is hardly financially stable, and for most of the series he works for a non-profit organization, writing letters on behalf of political prisoners, protesting overfishing of the delicious Chilean sea bass, and performing other deeds that he cares little about, as he chose the job because it was close to his apartment. Mike went on to a short-lived career at a video game company before working as the sound guy for porn films, and later into unemployment. Mike dated Liz for over a year, and his attempts to break up with her during the first episode of the second season were thwarted when she dumped him first. Before Eddie Kaye Thomas was cast as Mike, both Will Friedle (Boy Meets World) and Josh Radnor (How I Met Your Mother) were attached to the role at one time.
 Liz Lombardi (played by Lauren Stamile) – Mike's girlfriend for over a year, Liz was frequently seen trying to get Mike to better himself and take more control of his life.
 Chau Presley (played by John Cho) – Chau is Mike and Euan's Vietnamese restaurateur friend. His restaurant is called Qui Nhon. Some of his wacky antics consists of accidentally burning Mike's apartment, making money betting at illegal cock fights, and dating a homeless girl who showed signs of being insane. He is the most free-spirited of the group. He is frequently looking for new schemes to attract the ladies, some of which work (such as claiming to be an MTV director when Cribs profiled Status Quo, and starting a fake band, The Chau Project, and booking a gig, despite not having any songs), and some of which don't (buying a ferret and carrying it on his shoulder for a week). His excuses and explanations are frequently outlandish. He once claimed that Euan had a bedspread made of puppies in order to woo a contestant on The Real World away from him.
 Nathan Cole, aka. Status Quo (played by Jason George) – A Grammy-Award-winning rapper often followed by his "posse people" MC French and DJ Cheddar, he lets down his tough facade around his friends. He secretly enjoys cooking, owned a fastidiously groomed standard poodle named D'Artagnan, is close friends with Martha Stewart and once briefly dated Cher. He had a long-time crush on Liz, but they refrained from pursuing a relationship, realizing that they couldn't risk their friendship and Scrabble games.

Supporting
 Dr. Barry Wasserman (played by Eugene Levy) – Appears in "The Unkindest Cut" and "P.P. Doc II: The Examination Continues." Wasserman is a urologist who inexplicably has a large cult following. Dedicated to his work, he calls his car "The Penismobile" (its license plate reads "PPDOC"), and he frequently has to explain to people that he's not joking. He is allegedly the urologist of choice for P.Diddy, Bruce Springsteen and Bob Dylan, which makes him irresistible to women. Wasserman moved into the Hadley building after his wife committed suicide. He frequently makes jokes about his dead wife that no one finds funny but him.
 Jordan (played by Rayne Marcus) – Introduced as a sort of female counterpart to Chau, Jordan is Liz's friend, who, according to Euan, has no social filter. Jordan says whatever is on her mind with no concern for the people around her, which creates several embarrassing situations, especially in restaurants. She and Chau briefly dated, before an argument about who was hotter - Owen Wilson (her choice) or Luke Wilson (Chau's choice) ended their relationship. She works as an assistant to Dr. Wasserman. Jordan refuses to use slang words for the notion of 'sexual intercourse', thereby referring to it as such or otherwise as coïtus.

Guest stars
Among the show's notable guest stars are Carmen Electra (as herself), and American Pie alumni Eugene Levy (as urologist Dr. Barry Wasserman), Jason Biggs (as Rick Steve, the man with two first names) and Shannon Elizabeth (as Dawn, a girlfriend of Chau's who adores seeing him get beat up). Tanya Roberts guest-stars in one episode as an older woman who ends up dating Euan. The show has one-off appearances by Jenna Fischer in "The Backup" and  Zachary Quinto in "Diddler on the Roof" before they found fame on The Office and Heroes, respectively. There is also One Tree Hill star Bethany Joy Galeotti, and Perrey Reeves in "A Cute Triangle" prior to her turn on Entourage.

Episodes

Series overview

Season 1 (2001–02)

Season 2 (2002)

Cancellation 
The show aired on The WB network on Sunday nights in its first season, and was renewed for a second season to be part of a new Thursday night comedy block. However, the move to Thursday did not help the lowly-rated show, and it was cancelled seven episodes into the second season, leaving two episodes ("Scary Sitcom" and "Chau's Hard Iced Tea") unfilmed.

Controversy
While it aired, the show was controversial for its raunchy content, as topics addressed included threesomes, circumcision, pornography and masturbation. On March 4, 2002, as the show faced pressure from watchdog groups such as the Parents Television Council (which voted Off Centre the second worst show for family viewing in 2002), The New York Post printed a memo from the WB's Standards and Practices Department to the creators of the show that stated: "It is essential to reduce and/or modify the significant number of uses of 'penis,' 'testicles,' 'foreskin' as well as euphemisms for the same, such as 'your thingie,'" the memo says in part. It also orders the exclusion of such references as "covered wagon", "unit", "turtleneck", "little fella", "anteater", "diddy", "cloaking device" and "my pig is still snuggly, wrapped in his doughy blanket."

The episode which dealt with circumcision, "The Unkindest Cut", came under fire because of its treatment of the character Euan, who is British and has not been circumcised (the procedure is not routine and is uncommon in Europe and other parts of the world including Asia and South America), as well as the treatment of uncircumcised men in general.

Ratings

References

External links 
 
 

2001 American television series debuts
2002 American television series endings
2000s American sitcoms
English-language television shows
Manhattan in fiction
Television series by DreamWorks Television
Television series by Warner Bros. Television Studios
Television shows set in New York City
The WB original programming